Go motion is a variation of stop motion animation which incorporates motion blur into each frame involving motion. It was co-developed by Industrial Light & Magic and Phil Tippett. Stop motion animation can create a disorienting, and distinctive staccato effect, because the animated object is perfectly sharp in every frame, since each frame of the animation was actually shot when the object was perfectly still. Real moving objects in similar scenes of the same movie will have motion blur, because they moved while the shutter of the camera was open. Filmmakers use a variety of techniques to simulate motion blur, such as moving the model slightly during the exposure of each film frame or using a glass plate smeared with petroleum jelly in front of the camera lens to blur the moving areas.

History 
In the 1920s, Ladislas Starevich started using this technique by the time he started making films in France. He moved the puppet or the set during the exposure of the frame to create motion blur. Some of this can be seen in films like The Midnight Wedding, Love in Black and White, The Voice of the Nightingale or The Little Parade and more extensively in the battle scene of The Queen of the Butterflies (1924) and The Mascot (1933).

Phil Tippett and Industrial Light & Magic later recreated the go motion technique for some shots of the tauntaun creatures and AT-AT walkers in the 1980 Star Wars film The Empire Strikes Back. After that, go motion was used for many other movies: for the dragon in Dragonslayer (1981), the dinosaurs in the prehistoric documentaries Prehistoric Beast (1984) and Dinosaur! (1985), the harpy sequence in Young Sherlock Holmes (1985), the lord demon creature in Howard the Duck (1986), the winged demon in The Golden Child (1986), the extraterrestrial living flying machines in Batteries Not Included (1987), the two-headed Eborsisk dragon in Willow (1988), Coneheads (1993). Other minor sequences using go motion appeared in films like the first three Indiana Jones installments (1981–1989) and E.T. the Extra-Terrestrial (1982) among a few others.

In 1993, with the release of Jurassic Park, Tippett Studio abandoned go motion and fully converted its teams and equipment to CG computer-graphics. The last film using go motion was Coneheads (Jurassic Park was released on June 11, 1993 but Coneheads was released on July 23, 1993).

Methods for creating motion blur

Petroleum jelly 
This crude but reasonably effective technique involves smearing petroleum jelly ("Vaseline") on a plate of glass in front of the camera lens, also known as vaselensing, then cleaning and reapplying it after each shot — a time-consuming process, but one which creates a blur around the model. This technique was used for the endoskeleton in The Terminator. This process was also employed by Jim Danforth to blur the pterodactyl's wings in Hammer Films' When Dinosaurs Ruled the Earth, and by Randal William Cook on the terror dogs sequence in Ghostbusters.

Bumping the puppet
Gently bumping or flicking the puppet before taking the frame will produce a slight blur; however, care must be taken when doing this that the puppet does not move too much or that one does not bump or move props or set pieces

Moving the table
Moving the table on which the model is standing while the film is being exposed creates a slight, realistic blur. This technique was developed by Ladislas Starevich: when the characters ran, he moved the set in the opposite direction. This is seen in The Little Parade when the ballerina is chased by the devil. Starevich also used this technique on his films The Eyes of the Dragon, The Magical Clock and The Mascot. Aardman Animations used this for the train chase in The Wrong Trousers and again during the lorry chase in A Close Shave. In both cases the cameras were moved physically during a 1-2 second exposure. The technique was revived for the full-length Wallace & Gromit: The Curse of the Were-Rabbit.

Go motion
The most sophisticated technique was originally developed for the film The Empire Strikes Back and used for some shots of the tauntauns and was later used on films like Dragonslayer and is quite different from traditional stop motion. The model is essentially a rod puppet. The rods are attached to motors which are linked to a computer that can record the movements as the model is traditionally animated. When enough movements have been made, the model is reset to its original position, the camera rolls and the model is moved across the table. Because the model is moving during shots, motion blur is created.

A variation of go motion was used in E.T. the Extra-Terrestrial to partially animate the children on their bicycles.

Go motion today
Go motion was originally planned to be used extensively for the dinosaurs in Jurassic Park, until Steven Spielberg decided to try out the swiftly developing techniques of CG instead.

Today, the mechanical method of achieving motion blur using go motion is rarely used, as it is more complicated, slow, and labor-intensive than computer generated effects. However, the motion blurring technique still has potential in real stop motion movies where the puppet's motions are supposed to be somewhat realistic. Many professional visual effects applications now allow for motion blur to be simulated in post production.

See also 
 Tippett Studio

References

Works cited

External links
Explanation Stop Motion Works site with images and brief description of a Go motion mover used for the stop motion dragon puppet in the movie Dragonslayer (1981)
Phil Tippett on "go motion" and how it is shot

Cinematic techniques
Stop motion
Animation techniques